Donald Crews (born August 30, 1938) is an American illustrator and writer of children's picture books. In 2015, the American Library Association (ALA) honored him with the Laura Ingalls Wilder Medal, recognizing his lasting contribution to children's literature. 

His works Freight Train (1978) and Truck (1980) were Caldecott Honor recipients.

Early life

Donald Crews was born in Newark, New Jersey in 1938. His mother worked as a seamstress, and his father worked at the railroad and several other odd jobs. Raised in Newark, Crews spent summers at his grandparents' home in rural Cottondale, Florida, with his mother and three siblings. These summers were inspiration for the autobiographical books Bigmama's (1991) and Shortcut (1992).

Encouraged by a high school teacher, Crews pursued art as a career. He attended Cooper Union in New York City and graduated in 1959. While at Cooper Union, Crews met his future wife, graphic artist Ann Jonas.

Career

Crews was drafted into the army in 1963, and sent to Frankfurt, Germany.  While in Germany, he designed a children's alphabet book to include in his portfolio. After multiple rejections, the book was published as We Read: A to Z by Harper & Row (now HarperCollins) in 1967. Crews' second children's book, Ten Black Dots, was published the following year. In addition to children's books, he continued working as a freelance graphic designer and illustrator. 

A recurring motif in Crews' work is transportation, seen in books Freight Train (1978), Truck (1980), Harbor (1982), School Bus (1984), and Flying (1986). Freight Train and Truck were both awarded Caldecott Honors. These works use minimal text, focusing primarily on visuals, and rarely feature people. On this style, Crews said:Freight Train was close to the time when I was doing most of my work as a designer, and abstraction and brevity and symbol were more important to me, were more significant to the way I did my work.In the 1990s, Crews began to create more personal works. Autobiographical books Bigmama's (1991) and Shortcut (1992) reflect on childhood summers with his grandparents, "Bigmama" and "Bigpapa", in Florida. Crews said that Bigmama's originated "from telling the story to [his] nieces and nephews and discussing it with [his] siblings and [his] parents". [T]he young people wanted to know more about what it looked like– what we meant by an outhouse, and the barn and the big house. We had few photographs of that experience. And I thought of it [Bigmama's] more in terms of a way of clarifying the stories that we told all the time. An additional motivation for Crews' autobiographical stories is "the fact that there aren't very many books about Black families and their lives".

Personal life

Crews and Jonas were married in Germany in 1963, and had two daughters. Their first daughter, Nina, was born in Germany, and their second daughter, Amy, was born in New York. Nina is also an award-winning children's book author.

The couple lived in New York City until 1996, when they relocated to a restored farmhouse in the Hudson River Valley. Jonas died in September 2013.

Selected works

Bicycle Race (1985)
Bigmama's (1991)
Carousel (1982)
Cloudy Day Sunny Day (1999)
Flying (1986)
 Freight Train (1978) – Caldecott Honor Book
Inside Freight Train (2001)
Harbor (1982)
Light (1981)
Night at the Fair (1998)
Parade (1983)
Sail Away (1995)
School Bus (1984)
Shortcut (1992)
Ten Black Dots (1968)
Truck (1980) – Caldecott Honor Book
We Read: A to Z (1967)

As illustrator only
Blue Sea (written by Robert Kalan) (1979)
Each Orange Had 8 Slices (written by Paul Giganti, Jr.) (1992) 
How Many Snails (written by Paul Giganti, Jr.) (1988) 
More Than One (written by Miriam Schlein) (1996) 
Rain (written by Robert Kalan) (1978)
This Is the Sunflower (written by Lola M. Schaefer) (2000) 
Tomorrow's Alphabet (written by George Shannon) (1996)

References

Donald Crews entry at HarperCollins website.
Donald Crews: the signs and times of an American childhood by George Bodmer from the Spring 1998 issue of the African American Review. (accessed May 31, 2006)

External links

 
 

1938 births
Living people
Writers from Newark, New Jersey
American children's book illustrators
American children's writers
Laura Ingalls Wilder Medal winners
American male writers
Caldecott Honor winners